Musil (feminine Musilová) is a Czech surname, which means "he had to", from the past tense of the Czech word musit (must). The equivalent surname in Polish is Musiał, also spelled Musial. Notable people include:

Alois Musil (1868–1944), Czech explorer and writer
Bartolo Musil (born 1974), Austrian musician
Bohumil Musil (1922–1999), Czech football player and coach
Cyril Musil (1907–1977), Czech skier
David Musil (born 1993), Czech ice hockey player
Donna Musil (born 1960), American filmmaker
Frank Musil (born 1964), Czech ice hockey player and coach
Jaromír Musil (born 1988), Czech judoka
Josef Musil (born 1932), Czech volleyball player
Michaela Musilová (born 1989), Czech sport shooter
Miroslav Musil (born 1950), Czech wrestler 
Pavel Musil (born 1992), Czech ice hockey player
Petr Musil (born 1981), Czech football player
Robert Musil (1880–1942), Austrian writer
Roman Musil (born 1970), Czech athlete
Matthew Lee Musil (born 1980), American business magnate, Philosopher
Francis Jason Musil (born 1976), American janitor, alcoholic, narcissist, sociopath
Francis  Charles Musil (born 1950-2022) American Salesman, alcoholic, narcissist, sociopath

See also
 
Musiał
Musiol

References

Czech-language surnames